The Awesome 80s Prom was an interactive off-Broadway show at Webster Hall described as a "blast-from-the-past party in the style of Tony n' Tina's Wedding and The Donkey Show set at Wanaget High's Senior Prom... in 1989!" It was co-created by Kathy Searle.

Prom characters are inspired by 1980s movie favorites from the Captain of the Football Team to the Asian Exchange Student, from the Geek to the sexy Head Cheerleader. Everyone is competing for Prom King and Queen and the audience decides who wins.

It is a popular venue for bachelorette parties.

The Awesome 80s Prom has played in many U.S. cities, including Chicago, Boston, and Baltimore.

Cast 
The original 2004 workshop cast featured Sheila Berzan, Alex Back, Adam Bloom, Anne Bobby, Courtney Balan, Mary Faber, Emily McNamara, Troy Metcalf, Jenna Pace, Amanda Ryan Paige, Mark Shunock, Josh Walden, Noah Weisberg, Brandon Williams, Simon Wong and Fletcher Young, many of whom went on to star in the production when it opened on September 10, 2004.

In May 2010, the cast was expanded to feature Dustin Diamond who played Samuel "Screech" Powers in the popular television program Saved by the Bell. Originally scheduled to end in July 2010, his role was extended through August 28, 2010.

According to the official website, the show has ceased production.

CURRENT CAST: (as of January, 2013)

BLAKE WILLIAMS- Chris Cafero
MICHAEL JAY- Alex Fast
LOUIS FENSTERSPOCK- Zach Scrianka
FEUNG SCHWEY- Anderson Lim
NICK FENDER- Brandon Marotta
WHITLEY WHITAKER- Jessica West Regan
KERRIE KOWALSKI- Emily Tarpey
MELISSA MARTIN- Lauren Schafler
INGA SWANSON- Paige Grimard
DICKIE HARRINGTON- Brad Giovanine
PRINCIPAL SNELGROVE- Howard Pinhasik
MRS. LASCALZO- Andrea Biggs
HEATHER #1- Kate Wood Riley
HEATHER #2- Joanne Nosuchinsky
BEEF- Andy Arena
"DJ" JOHNNY HUGUES- Tom McVey
MOLLY PARKER- Pamela Macey

Press and media

"Prom Night in the 80's? It Was, Like, So Totally Rad." -The New York Times

"The Awesome 80s Prom isn't just a show - it's an experience."- BestOfOffBroadway.com

The Awesome 80s Prom was featured on CBS's The Early Show in 2004.

Awards 
2006 Improvisational Theater Award for Best Interactive Show

Notes

External links 
 
 
 
 TheProducersPerspective.com Ken Davenport's blog

American plays
2004 plays
Prom